Hušica is a small settlement in the Municipality of Tržič in the Upper Carniola region of Slovenia.

Geography
Hušica consists of three farms on the ridge of a hill on the edge of mixed forest along the road from Brezje pri Tržiču to Kovor. There is a cold spring west of the village near Strašnik Creek.

Name
The name Hušica is pronounced Hušca in the local dialect. It is a diminutive of the name of Hudo (via *Hujšica), a larger neighboring village.

References

External links 

Hušica at Geopedia

Populated places in the Municipality of Tržič